Marcel Autaa (28 August 1902 – 12 December 1959) was a French racing cyclist. He rode in the 1928 Tour de France.

References

1902 births
1959 deaths
French male cyclists
Place of birth missing